Weather Guesser Nunataks is an isolated nunatak group 10 nautical miles (18 km) west-northwest of the Thomas Mountains in Palmer Land. First seen and photographed from the air by Ronne Antarctic Research Expedition (RARE), 1947–48. The name was suggested by Russell R. White, Jr., U.S. Navy aerographer and member of the University of Wisconsin survey party to the area, 1965–66.

Nunataks of Palmer Land